Feldwebel  (Fw or F) is a non-commissioned officer (NCO) rank in several countries. The rank originated in Germany, and is also used in Switzerland, Finland, Sweden, and Estonia. The rank has also been used in Russia, Austria-Hungary, occupied Serbia and Bulgaria.

There are variations on feldwebel, such as Oberstabsfeldwebel ("Superior Staff Field Usher"), which is the highest non-commissioned rank in the German army and air force.

Feldwebel in different languages

In Swiss German the spelling  is used.

Feldwebel in different countries and armed forces

Austria

Feldwebel was a typical infantry rank of the k.u.k. Austro-Hungarian Army (1867–1918). It might have been comparable to NCO-rank OR8./ Company Sergeant-major ranks in the British Army.

In the k.u.k. Austro-Hungarian Army Feldwebel was equivalent to:
Beschlagmeister I. Klasse (Master-Blacksmith 1st class) cavalry,
Feuerwerker (literal: Fire worker; en: Master-Sergeant) artillery,
Oberjaeger (en: Master-Sergeant) of the mountain troops and rifles, 
Rechnungs-Unteroffizier I. Klasse (en: Fiscal sergeant 1st class),
Regimentshornist (en: Regimental bugler), 
Regimentstambour (en: Regimental drummer), 
Wachtmeister (en: Master-Sergeant) cavalry, 
Waffenmeister I. Klasse (en: Weapon master 1st class) artillery and weapon arsenal,
Einjährig-Freiwilliger-Feldwebel (en: Master-Sergeant - volunteer serving one year), and 
Kadett-Feldwebel (en: Cadet-Master-Sergeant).

Then rank insignia was a gorget patch on the stand-up collar of the so-called Waffenrock (en: Tunic), and consisted of three white stars on 13 mm ragged yellow silk galloon. The gorget patch and the stand-up collar showed the particular Waffenfarbe (en: corps colour).

Examples (selection)

Bulgaria
In the Bulgarian army, фелдфебел (pronounced "feldfebel") existed from the late 19th century to the late 1940s, when the German-type military organization was phased out in favor of a new doctrine, identical to the Soviet one.

Estonia
The Estonian rank of "veebel" is derived from the name of the German rank "Feldwebel".

Finland

The Finnish Defence Force uses the ranks of vääpeli and ylivääpeli which are the third and second highest NCO ranks, respectively. Vääpeli is also the highest rank that can be awarded to a female non-conscript NCO who has not completed the volunteer female military service (equivalent to the male conscription service). The Finnish Navy's equivalent rank is pursimies.

In addition, the Finnish Defence Force uses vääpeli to indicate an NCO position (which might or might not be occupied by an NCO of the rank vääpeli) subordinate to the company commander. The unit's vääpeli is in charge of the company's personnel management as well as supply, provisioning and maintenance, including the maintenance of the premises inhabited by the unit. They are also responsible for maintaining the general order, discipline and unit cohesion. The company's vääpeli is the lowest-ranking FDF position that can conduct a preliminary investigation into suspected service-related crimes. Their powers with regard to punishment are limited to conscripts, who they can punish with either a warning or up to 6 hours of extra duties.

Germany

German Bundeswehr

In the modern German Bundeswehr, Feldwebel is considered a Senior NCO, due in part to the large number of Corporal positions which exist as junior grades.

The modern Bundeswehr NCO grades are as follows:
Junior NCOs (de: Unteroffiziere ohne Portepee) – Unteroffizier, Stabsunteroffizier (NATO-Rank Code OR 5a, 5c)
Fähnrich ranks: Fahnenjunker (OR-5b), Fähnrich (OR-6b) and Oberfähnrich (OR-7) are ranks only held by Officer aspirants (OA)  (en: Officer candidate or Officer Designate)
Portepeeunteroffizier (Senior NCOs)

The sequence of ranks (top-down approach) in that particular group (NCOs with portepee or Senior NCOs with portepee) is as follows:
OR-9: Oberstabsfeldwebel / Oberstabsbootsmann
OR-8: Stabsfeldwebel / Stabsbootsmann
OR-7: Hauptfeldwebel / Hauptbootsmann
OR-6a: Oberfeldwebel / Oberbootsmann
OR-6b: Feldwebel / Bootsmann

19th century and Kaiserreich
Feldwebel gained its widest usage under the German military beginning from the early 19th century. The highest-ranking non-commissioned officer until 1918, the Feldwebel acted as Company Sergeant Major. By contrast with some other countries, the position and duty of Regimental Sergeant Major never existed in Germany.

From 1877 veteran NCOs could be promoted to the rank of Feldwebel-Leutnant. This Army Reserve officer ranked with the Commissioned Officers, but was always inferior to the lowest Leutnant.

From 1887 the Offizierstellvertreter (Deputy Officer) ranked as a kind of Warrant Officer (more NCO than officer) between Feldwebel and the commissioned officers.

There were three further NCO ranks: Vizefeldwebel (Vice Feldwebel, senior NCO), Sergeant (junior NCO) and Unteroffizier (Lance Sergeant or Corporal, junior NCO). The Gefreiter was not an NCO as he had no powers of authority, and was a higher grade of private soldier.

Reichswehr and Wehrmacht
After World War I, in the German Reichswehr and Wehrmacht, the Feldwebel rank group was divided into several grades:

Feldwebel (deputy), in the meaning of platoon sergeant,
Oberfeldwebel (platoon sergeant, possible appointment to Hauptfeldwebel (in the meaning of company sergeant major),
Stabsfeldwebel (special rank reserved for 25-year volunteers only).

Feldwebel and above were Unteroffiziere mit Portepee (Senior NCOs); Unterfeldwebel and Unteroffiziere were Unteroffiziere ohne Portepee (Junior NCOs). In 1921, the rank of Sergeant was renamed Unterfeldwebel. Unterfeldwebels did duty as squad/section leaders.

The Stabsfeldwebel rank was reserved for those who had enlisted for 25 year terms of service in the pre-war German military and those who were enlisted for shorter terms were not eligible to hold this rank.

The appointment of Hauptfeldwebel (Company sergeant major/First sergeant) could be held by Stabsfeldwebels or Oberfeldwebels only. NCOs of a lower rank (Feldwebel, Unterfeldwebel, Unteroffizier) holding this position were titled Hauptfeldwebeldiensttuer (i.e. acting Hauptfeldwebel).

Rank insignia Wehrmacht until 1945

Rank insignia GDR National People's Army until 1990
In the German Democratic Republic National People's Army Unteroffiziere ohne Portepee (en: junior NCO grades) were replaced by Unteroffiziere volunteer, and Unteroffiziere mit Portepee (en: senior NCO grades) were called «Unteroffiziere profesional». The shoulder board Rank insignia were as follows.

Russia
In the Imperial Russian Army a Feldfebel held the highest Unteroffizier rank from 1722 (its introduction into Peter the Great's Table of Ranks until 1826 (the introduction of the still-higher Unteroffizier ranks Podpraporshchik OR-7 and later Zauryad-praporshchik (зауряд-прапорщик; Praporshchik deputy) OR-8 in 1884). Feldwebels, even after the introduction of these senior ranks, were usually the most senior Unteroffiziers in a unit and held the positions of the unit's CO senior assistant or Starshina (старшина; Sergeant Major). When they were promoted to Zauryad-praporshchik OR-8 or Podpraporshchik OR-7 ranks, but still held the Feldfebel OR-6 positions, they were authorized to still wear the Feldvebel's bands on their shoulder boards. The cavalry equivalent of this rank was the vakhtmistr or vakhmistr (вахмистр - derived from German Wachtmeister), also OR-6.

 Rank insignia

Switzerland
Feldweibel is the lowest rank of "Higher Non-Commissioned Officers" in the Swiss Army. Until the "Reform XXI" agenda, there were two branches of Feldweibels: technical and company level.

The Feldweibel oversees unit-level military service and operations. In 2004, the rank of Hauptfeldweibel was introduced. Since then, only technical specialists have remained in the rank of Feldweibel.

See also
 History of Russian military ranks
 Ranks and insignia of NATO Armies Enlisted (Army)
 Ranks and insignia of NATO

References

Sources 
BROCKHAUS, Die Enzyklopädie in 24 Bänden (1796–2001), Band 5: 3-7653-3665-3, S. 487, Feldwebel

Military ranks of Germany